Rosa Amaral (born 21 June 1980) is a retired Angolan handball player.

She competed at the 2004 Summer Olympics, where Angola placed 9th.

References

External links

1980 births
Living people
Angolan female handball players
Olympic handball players of Angola
Handball players at the 2004 Summer Olympics